Alessandro Milesi may refer to:

Alessandro Milesi (painter) (1856–1945), Italian painter
Alessandro Milesi (footballer) (born 1999), Peruvian footballer